MR, Mr, mr, or mR may refer to:
 Mr., an honorific title before any man's name

Arts, entertainment, and media
 MR (Marina and Rainer), a 1989, one-act, multilingual opera libretto by Nikolai Korndorf
 Magyar Rádió, a Hungarian radio station
 Mixed reality, the merging of real and virtual worlds in digital visualisation
 Model Railroader, an American hobby magazine
 Meta Runner, an Australian web series

Businesses and organisations
 Chief Maqoma Regiment, an infantry regiment of the South African Army
 Mineral Resources, Australian mining company
 Mouvement Radical (Radical Movement), a French political party
 Mouvement Réformateur, a Belgian political party
 Martin Research, a defunct American computer company

Education
 mr., an academic degree, equivalent to Master of Laws, meester in de rechten, in Belgium and the Netherlands
 Menntaskólinn í Reykjavík, a junior college in Iceland

Identification codes
 Air Mauritanie (by IATA code)
 Marathi language (by ISO 639-1)
 Martinique (World Meteorological Organization country code)
 Mauritania (ISO 3166-1 alpha-2 and FIPS 10-4 country codes)
 .mr, the top-level Internet domain for Mauritania
 Morocco (Library of Congress MARC country code)

Law
 Master of the Rolls, the President of the Court of Appeal of England and Wales, Civil Division, and Head of Civil Justice
 mr., an academic degree, equivalent to Master of Laws, meester in de rechten, in Belgium and the Netherlands

Science and medicine
 Magnetoresistance, change in electrical resistance due to a magnetic field
 Mendelian randomization, a way of using genetic information to estimate causal effects
 Mental retardation, generalised learning or intellectual disability, in now obsolete jargon
 Millirem, a unit of radiation dose
 Mineralocorticoid receptor, a human protein
 Mitral regurgitation of blood flow in the heart
 Relative molecular mass, mass of a given molecule, Mr

Transportation
 M.R. (automobile), a microcar model built in 1945
 Air Mauritanie (by IATA code) 
 Midland Railway, a United Kingdom railway
 Nissan MR engine
 Rear mid-engine, rear-wheel-drive layout, an automotive layout

See also
 Magnetic resonance (disambiguation)
 Mister (disambiguation)